Troedrhiwffenyd is a hamlet in the community of Llandysul, Ceredigion, Wales, which is 63.2 miles (101.7 km) from Cardiff and 183.2 miles (294.8 km) from London. Troedrhiwffenyd is represented in the Senedd by Elin Jones (Plaid Cymru) and is part of the Ceredigion constituency in the House of Commons.

See also 
 List of localities in Wales by population

References 

Villages in Ceredigion
Llandysul